Robert W. "Bob" Godshall (May 15, 1933 – November 24, 2019) was a Republican member of the Pennsylvania House of Representatives for the 53rd District and was elected in 1982.

Career
In 1979, Godshall was elected Montgomery County Controller and served in that position until he was elected to the House in 1982.

For the 2009-10 legislative session, Godshall served on the House Insurance and Rules Committees and was Republican chairman of the House Consumer Affairs Committee.

He served on the board of trustees of the National Constitution Center in Philadelphia, which is a museum dedicated to the U.S. Constitution.

Personal
Godshall was a graduate of Souderton High School. He graduated from Juniata College and attended but did not graduate from the University of Pennsylvania Wharton School of Business. Godshall served on the Souderton Area School Board from 1963 to 1980. Godshall died a hospital in Sellersville, Pennsylvania on November 24, 2019 at the age of 86.

References

External links
Representative Godshall's site
Representative Bob Godshall's official web site
Pennsylvania House profile

1933 births
2019 deaths
People from Souderton, Pennsylvania
American Mennonites
School board members in Pennsylvania
Republican Party members of the Pennsylvania House of Representatives
Wharton School of the University of Pennsylvania alumni
21st-century American politicians
Juniata College alumni